Merkaz HaCarmel also called Carmel Merkazi or in English, Carmel Center, is a neighborhood, and cultural and recreation area on the slopes of Mount Carmel in Haifa, Israel.

History
Until the mid-19th century Mount Carmel was largely uninhabited, except for temporary accommodation of shepherds and hermits, because it was far from the coast – and the walled Old Haifa. Ownership of the land was divided between the state, the Carmelite Order, and residents of the Arab village of Al Tira (which is today the city of Tirat Carmel). The mountain became famous for its uneven road, known as the "High Road" (as opposed to the "Lower Road" now called "Derekh Hahagana").

During the 19th century the Carmelite Order acquired estates in Stella Maris and Wadi Siach. The German Templer settlement on Mount Carmel at the end of the 19th century marked the beginning of the development of the area. The purchase of land in the area by the ILD just after the First World War, led to the development of the area as a Jewish neighborhood surrounded by gardens, as it remains today.

Merkaz HaCarmel today
Since the establishment of the State of Israel, the Merkaz HaCarmel neighborhood has become a prestigious residential area, with shopping centers and local businesses including many European-style cafes, and several hotels and museums. Haifa Zoo was established in the early 1950s, near to the Gan HaEm garden. The station Gan HaEm is the upper terminus of the Carmelit funicular subway system. The Carmelit was built in the late 1950s and runs down Mount Carmel from Merkaz HaCarmel to Paris Square in downtown Haifa.

The Haifa Auditorium and the Haifa Cinematheque. were built in the 1970s. The Louis Promenade, built in 1992, runs adjacent with Yefe Nof Street and offers striking views over the city of Haifa.

Hotels

Gardens

Museums

The city of Haifa, led by Abba Hushi, purchased the former home of Frederick Kisch (who lived there 1934–1939) on HaNassi Avenue and established the Tikotin Museum of Japanese Art there in 1959.

The Mane-Katz Museum houses the work of Emmanuel Mane-Katz. Katz had lived and worked in Merkaz HaCarmel in his later years after being offered a building by mayor Abba Hushi. After his death, he left his work and extensive collection of personal Jewish ethnography to the city of Haifa.

In February 1962, the Moshe Shteklis Museum of Prehistory was founded as a municipal museum. The museum displays prehistoric finds from archaeological excavations in Carmel, mostly from Nahal Oren and Kebara Cave, and finds from underwater excavations of the neolithic village of Atlit Yam, off the coast of Atlit.

In 2012 the Munio Gitai Weinraub Architecture Museum opened in the studio in HaNassi Avenue (near the Cinematheque) where architect Munio Weinraub lived and worked.

Other buildings
In 1952 Haifa Zoo was established.

In 1974 Haifa Auditorium was established in Merkaz HaCarmel, and in 1975, Haifa Cinematheque was established there.

Louis Promenade

In 1992, the Louis Promenade was built along Yefe Nof Street, and runs from Hotel Nof to the Emperor's Monument, near to the entrance to the upper Terraces of the Shrine of the Báb. The promenade was donated by Paul and May Goldschmidt, Haifa residents originally from South Africa, in memory of their son Louis (Ariel) who was killed in a car accident. (The Goldschmidt family later contributed to the renovation of Haifa Zoo including the provision of electric cars to provide accessibility for the disabled.)

At the far end of the promenade stands a monument to the 1997 Israeli helicopter disaster, in which 73 people were killed.

Transportation
Merkaz HaCarmel is served by the Carmelit's Carmel Center station.

References 

Neighborhoods of Haifa